Samu Fóti (17 May 1890 in Budapest – 17 June 1916 in Lipové) was a Hungarian gymnast who competed in the 1912 Summer Olympics.  He was Jewish.

He was part of the Hungarian team which won the silver medal in the gymnastics men's team, European system event in 1912. He also competed in the men's discus throw at the 1912 Summer Olympics.

See also
 List of select Jewish gymnasts

References

External links
 profile 

1890 births
1916 deaths
Hungarian male artistic gymnasts
Gymnasts from Budapest
Jewish gymnasts
Gymnasts at the 1912 Summer Olympics
Olympic gymnasts of Hungary
Olympic silver medalists for Hungary
Olympic medalists in gymnastics
Hungarian Jews
Austro-Hungarian military personnel of World War I
Medalists at the 1912 Summer Olympics
Athletes (track and field) at the 1912 Summer Olympics
Hungarian male discus throwers
Olympic athletes of Hungary
Athletes from Budapest